Ptychovalva is a genus of moth in the family Gelechiidae.

Species
 Ptychovalva obruta Meyrick, 1921
 Ptychovalva trigella Zeller, 1852
 Ptychovalva trimaculata Janse, 1960

References

Chelariini